Sosnovsky District is an administrative district (raion), one of the forty in Nizhny Novgorod Oblast, Russia. Municipally, it is incorporated as Sosnovsky Municipal District. It is located in the southwest of the oblast. Its administrative center is the urban locality (a work settlement) of Sosnovskoye. Population: 19,546 (2010 Census);  The population of Sosnovskoye accounts for 44.7% of the district's total population.

History
The district was established in 1935.

References

Notes

Sources

Districts of Nizhny Novgorod Oblast
States and territories established in 1935
 
